Ron Gillham is an American Republican politician from Alaska. He has represented District 30 as a Member of the Alaska House of Representatives since 2021.

Political positions 
Gillham endorsed Nick Begich III in the 2022 Alaska's at-large congressional district special election.

References

External links 
 Ron Gillham at Ballotpedia

Living people
Republican Party members of the Alaska House of Representatives
21st-century American politicians
Year of birth missing (living people)